Scenic and Historic Byways are highways in New Mexico known for their scenic beauty or historic significance. The New Mexico State Highway and Transportation Department Scenic and Historic Byways Program was made effective July 31, 1998 to establish procedures for designating and managing state scenic and historic byways.

List

State designated byways
The following table is a list of scenic byways in New Mexico according to the U.S. Secretary of Transportation:

Other byways

Notes

References



Historic trails and roads in the United States

New Mexico geography-related lists